Sohini Sarkar is an Indian Bengali film and television actress. She played the title character in the 2011–2012 TV series Adwitiya. Sarkar made her film debut in the 2013 film Rupkatha Noy. In the same year she acted in the film Phoring. In 2018, she was nominated at Filmfare awards east for best actress in leading role for the film Bibaho Diaries.

Filmography

Web series

Television works

References

External links
 

Living people
Bengali actresses
1985 births